The John Price Wetherill Medal was an award of the Franklin Institute.  It was established with a bequest given by the family of John Price Wetherill (1844–1906) on April 3, 1917.  On June 10, 1925, the Board of Managers voted to create a silver medal, to be awarded for "discovery or invention in the physical sciences" or "new and important combinations of principles or methods already known".  The legend on the first medal read: "for discovery, invention, or development in the physical sciences". The John Price Wetherill Medal was last awarded in 1997.  As of 1998 all of the endowed medals previously awarded by the Franklin Institute were reorganized as the Benjamin Franklin Medals.

Recipients 
 1926 Frank Twyman, Wagner Electric Corporation
 1927 Carl Ethan Akeley, North East Appliances Inc.
 1928 Albert S. Howell, Frank E. Ross
 1929 Gustave Fast, William H. Mason, Johannes Ruths
 1930 Charles S. Chrisman, William N. Jennings
 1931 Thomas Tarvin Gray, Arthur J. Mason, Edwin G. Steele, Walter L. Steele, Henry M. Sutton, Edward C. Wente
 1932 Halvor O. Hem, Monroe Calculating Machine Company, Carl George Munters, Baltzar von Platen, Frank Wenner
 1933 Henry S. Hulbert, Industrial Brownhoist Corporation, Koppers Company, Francis C. McMath, Robert R. McMath
 1934 E. Newton Harvey, Alfred L. Loomis, Johannes B. Ostermeier
 1935 F. Hope-Jones, Francis Ferdinand Lucas, Robert E. Naumburg, William H. Shortt, James Edmond Shrader, Louis Bryant Tuckermann, Henry Ellis Warren
 1936 Albert L. Marsh
 1939 William Albert Hyde
 1940 Laurens Hammond, Edward Ernst Kleinschmidt, Howard L. Krum
 1941 Harold Stephen Black
 1943 Robert Howland Leach
 1944 Richard C. DuPont, Willem Fredrik Westendorp
 1946 Lewis A. Rodert
 1947 Kenneth S. M. Davidson
 1948 Wendell Frederick Hess
 1949 Edgar Collins Bain, Thomas L. Fawick, Harlan D. Fowler
 1950 Donald William Kerst, Sigurd Varian, Russell Varian
 1951 Samuel C. Collins, Reid Berry Gray, Gaylord W. Penney
 1952 Martin E. Nordberg, Harrison P. Hood, Albert J. Williams Junior,
 1953 Robert H. Dalton, Stanley Donald Stookey
 1954 William D. Buckingham, Clarence Nichols Hickman, Edwin T. Lorig
 1955 Louis M. Moyroud, Rene A. Higonnet, Jacques Yves Pierre SeJournet
 1957 Warren W. Carpenter, Martin Company,
 1958 Henry Boot, J. Sayers, John Randall
 1959 Robert B. Aitchison, Archer J. P. Martin, Anthony Trafford James, Clarence Zener, R. L. M. Synge
 1960 Raimond Castaing, Walter Juda, Victor Vacquier
 1961 Albert E. Hitchcock, Percy W. Zimmerman
 1962 Ernest Ambler, Raymond Webster Hayward, Dale Dubois Hoppes, Ralph P. Hudson, Stanley Donald Stookey, Chien-Shiung Wu
 1963 Daryl M. Chapin, Calvin Souther Fuller, Gerald L. Pearson
 1964 Howard Aiken, John Eugene Gunzler, John Kenneth Hulm, Bernd Matthias
 1965 Edward Ching-Te Chao, Wendell F. Moore, John Hamilton Reynolds, Frederick D. Rossini, Eugene Shoemaker, Fred Noel Spiess
 1966 Howard G. Rogers, Britton Chance
 1967 Ernest Omar Wollan
 1968 Nathan Cohn
 1969 George R. Cowan, John J. Douglass, Arnold H. Holtzman
 1970 Paul D. Bartlett
 1971 Felix Wankel
 1972 Otto Herbert Schmitt
 1973 A. R. Howell
 1974 Aage Bohr, Ben Mottelson
 1975 Donald Newton Langenberg, William Henry Parker, Barry Norman Taylor
 1976 Herbert Blades, James W. Cronin, Val Fitch
 1978 William Klemperer
 1979 Elias Burstein
 1980 Ralph Alpher, Robert Herman
 1981 Frank F. Fang, Alan B. Fowler, Webster E. Howard, Frank Stern, Philip J. Stiles
 1982 Lawrence A. Harris
 1984 Eugene Garfield
 1985 Lynn A. Conway, Carver A. Mead
 1986 Alvin Van Valkenburg
 1987 Dennis H. Klatt
 1990 Akito Arima
 1991 Peter John Twin
 1992 Gerald E. Brown
 1994 Stirling A. Colgate
 1997 Federico Capasso

See also

 List of engineering awards
 List of physics awards

References

Franklin Institute awards
Physics awards
Engineering awards